Bolender is a German variant of the Swedish language surname Bolander.

Notable people with the surname include :
Bernard Bolender (1952–1995), American mass murderer
Bill Bolender (born 1940), American actor
John Bolender (1837–1902), American farmer and politician
Kurt Bolender (1912–1966), German Nazi SS officer and Holocaust perpetrator
Todd Bolender (1914–2006), American ballet dancer and choreographer
David M. Bolender (1969 --) United States Army Officer, Photojournalist, PATRIOT Missile Operator, Company Commander, Public Affairs Officer

German-language surnames